The FIL World Luge Championships 1978 took place in Imst, Austria.

Men's singles

Women's singles

Men's doubles

Medal table

References
Men's doubles World Champions
Men's singles World Champions
Women's singles World Champions

FIL World Luge Championships
Sport in Tyrol (state)
1978 in luge
1978 in Austrian sport
Luge in Austria